Drop Dead Live is a live album by the American punk rock band Lunachicks. It was released by Go-Kart Records in 1998.

Production
The album was recorded at New York City's Coney Island High, in February 1998.

Track listing
 "Yeah"
 "FDS"
 "The Day Squid's Gerbil Died"	
 "Gone Kissin"	
 "Fingerful"	
 "Thrown It Away"	
 "Spork"	
 "Don't Want You"
 "Jerk of All Trades"	
 "Wing Chun"	
 "Bitterness Barbie"	
 "Drop Dead"	
 "Donuts"	
 "The Passenger"
 "Buttplug"
 "Crash"	
 "Dear Dotti"	
 "#%@!"
 "Spoilt"

References

External links
 Lunachicks on Myspace

1998 live albums
Lunachicks albums
Go-Kart Records albums